Francis Pasche (7 May 1910 – 12 September 1996) was a French psychoanalyst.

1910 births
1996 deaths
French psychoanalysts
People in health professions from Paris
20th-century French physicians